Spies Are Forever is an original musical by the comedy troupe Tin Can Brothers (Corey Lubowich, Joey Richter, and Brian Rosenthal) and features music and lyrics by TalkFine (Clark Baxtresser and Pierce Siebers). The Tin Can Brothers wrote the book and produced the musical, with Lubowich taking on the role of director and Richter and Rosenthal both playing starring roles in the show.  The musical is set in the 1960s, and is a parody of the spy film genre. It is the Tin Can Brothers' first scripted project.

The musical was performed between March 11 and April 3, 2016, in Los Angeles, California. Digital tickets were made available through the musical's Kickstarter campaign, allowing backers to watch a recording of the show while it was still in its initial run. The musical was uploaded to YouTube in weekly episodes, which began with a two episode premiere on June 21, 2016. A cast recording was released earlier the same day.

The Spies Are Forever cast reunited in June 2016 to perform as part of StarKid Productions' summer season. They performed a staged concert featuring scenes and songs from the show, entitled Spies Are Forever: RELOADED.

A concert of Spies Are Forever was scheduled to be held on June 8, 2020, in Feinstein's/54 Below in New York City, but was cancelled due to the COVID-19 pandemic. It would have starred all original cast members except for Joe Walker, with the addition of Britney Coleman, AJ Holmes, Pomme Koch, and Carlos Valdes. The concert was rescheduled for October 2022.

Synopsis

Act I
At the Russian Weapons Facility in 1957, Agent Curt Mega has been captured and is being tortured for information involving his agency. Agent Owen Carvour is revealed to be undercover as one of the Russian operatives, and he and Curt escape the compound, communicating with Cynthia Houston, the director of the Americans and also Barbara Larvernor, a medical scientist. During the two calls, it is revealed that Owen works for the British Secret Service, although Cynthia wants him to work for the Americans. Curt rashly plans to blow up the weapons facility instead of just giving Barb the plans he has stolen. He drops a banana peel and, when criticized by Owen, claims that it doesn't matter since the whole place will be garbage in a few minutes. He sets the bomb's timer for three minutes, trying to beat his and Owen's record for their fastest getaway. As Curt and Owen flee the facility, they are surrounded by Russian operatives. ("Spies are Forever"). They manage to get away when the Russians are distracted by the blast and go to make their escape, but Owen trips on the banana peel and falls, too injured to escape ("The Coldest Goodbye"). Curt is forced to leave his partner for dead.

Four years have passed, during which time Curt has been on leave grieving for Owen. During this time, he has grown a beard and become a self-loathing alcoholic. Having finally decided that it is time for him to get back into the Secret Service, Curt goes to a bar in Budapest to speak with The Informant. After repeating the code, "I hear the salty fish from down under is simply to die for," to several clueless bar patrons, Curt finally finds him. They discuss Curt's mission, and Curt, angered by The Informant's flippant attitude, implies the Informant's carelessness. The Informant responds by doubting Curt's competence, referring to the mysterious death of his partner. The Informant clears the bar and Curt wonders if he can do this again ("Spy Again").

Meanwhile, on a nearby loading dock, a deadly arms deal is going down between The Deadliest Man Alive and Company, and Sergio Santos, a family man ("Somebody's Gotta Do It"). Curt and Tatiana Slozhno, a Russian spy, stop the deal from being made, but both The Deadliest Man Alive and Sergio escape. Tatiana and Curt fight for possession of the bomb, and Tatiana overcomes Curt and escapes as well. Before she flees, Curt grabs a business card from her, which bears the name of the hotel she is staying at.

A few days later, at the American Secret Service HQ, Curt meets with Cynthia in her office, where she expresses her displeasure at the failure of the mission. She tells Curt more about The Deadliest Man Alive and orders Curt to be a better spy, giving him some tough love. She then informs him that there is a World Peace Gala later in the week, which will be a "coming out party" for the New Democratic Republic of Old Socialist Prussian Sloviskia. She tells Curt in confidence that all the world leaders feel that the prince of the country is completely incompetent, but that the USA must try to win his alliance so as to "fuck the Russians". She lectures Curt about the implications of his incompetence, then sends him away ("Keep Your Eyes On The Prize I"). Curt goes to the A.S.S. Technology lab to gear up for his mission where he sees Barb again. Barb and the scientists show Curt all of their latest gadgets and forcibly shave his beard ("Pay Attention!"). Once she gives Curt everything he needs and sends him on his way, Barb confesses her feelings for Curt ("Barb's Lament").

At the Richman's Casino, Monte Carlo the following evening, Curt goes undercover to retrieve the bomb Tatiana has stolen ("Eyes On The Prize II"). Curt embarrasses himself in front of Tatiana along with the unwanted help of Richard "Dick" Big, a brash Texas businessman. Tatiana leads him up to her room where the Deadliest Man Alive is waiting to capture him. In Tatiana's hotel room, Dr. Baron Von Nazi (the Deadliest Man Alive's employer) appears and reveals his plan for Nazi world domination through a lavish musical number ("Not So Bad") (complete with a "Nazi Castle on a plot of land picked out by the Deadliest Man Alive") while Tatiana alludes to why she works for him. He then betrays Tatiana, telling her that she must continue to work for him and hinting that she may never pay off her debt. He orders The Deadliest Man Alive to kill Curt and leaves. The Deadliest Man Alive tells Curt that he plans to torture him until he dies. Conflicted, Tatiana decides to aid Curt in his escape and knocks the Deadliest Man Alive unconscious, but while they fight about her motives and Curt becomes momentarily distracted by the thought of Owen, the Deadliest Man Alive shoots Curt ("Torture Tango").

Act II
We open at the Geneva World Peace Gala in honor of Prussian independence and in celebration of their new prince, the fictional Toygle Feurgin. Everyone in attendance publicly praises the prince and gives him their full support, but in reality, everyone thinks he is incompetent and unqualified ("We Love the Prince!"). Cynthia is in attendance, and Curt (who is alive but badly injured) sneaks into the gala and finds her. He recounts his escape from Monte Carlo and the Nazis' plan to capture the prince. However, Curt has direct orders from Cynthia to abort his mission, and Cynthia refuses to budge. Curt decides to go rogue and reveals the Nazis' plan to the entire gala. Overhearing this, Von Nazi and the Deadliest Man Alive change their plan, shooting and killing the prince instead.

Tatiana and Curt flee to Curt's mother's safehouse in Guadeloupe. Alone, Tatiana tells Curt her story—at four years old, she was taken from her family by the KGB and trained as an assassin. When working as a killer finally became too much, her only means of escape from the organization was to flee Russia and abandon her family. She is not able to contact them out of fear that if her family knew her whereabouts, the Soviets would retaliate against her using her family ("Prisoner of My Past"). In return, Curt reveals his fears about his future and his reputation, as well as what happened to Owen. As the two grow closer, they acknowledge the stereotypical romantic relationship that seems to be unfolding between the leading male and female, and although neither is romantically attracted to the other, they flirt anyway. After they share a kiss, however, Tatiana rejects Curt, and they clear up the confusion about mixed signals, also leading to Curt revealing his homosexuality to her, and agree to be friends ("Doing This"). Mrs. Mega, oblivious to what is really going on, observes the couple from another room and begins to plan their wedding ("Pay Attention! (Reprise)").

Back in Prussia, Curt and Tatiana meet up with the Informant and Barb to prepare for the battle ahead. They drink together in celebration of their friendship ("One More Shot"). Von Nazi and the Deadliest Man Alive meet with members of the Prussian government to influence them to elect a new leader, and they agree to put the Nazis in power ("Not So Bad (Reprise)"). Curt and Tatiana arrive and the Prussian officials escape, but the Deadliest Man Alive stabs and kills Von Nazi and is revealed to be Owen in disguise. Owen tells Curt that he felt betrayed by Curt the night he fell and believed that Curt was unqualified to be a spy. He became involved with Chimera, an organization that was funding and developing a surveillance network. Killing Von Nazi allowed Owen access to materials (namely, the large silicon deposits on the land that was intended to hold the "Nazi Castle") to develop the technology and distribute it globally, invading the privacy of civilians around the world. After Owen reveals the location of the computer system housing the network he shoots and kills the Informant.

Tatiana and Curt agree to split up—Tatiana will destroy the computer system using the bomb Von Nazi made her steal, and Curt will go after Owen. At the International Weapons Museum, Curt and Owen fight until they have loaded pistols aimed at each other ("One Step Ahead"). Curt tells Owen that his facility is being destroyed, and Owen reveals that the single facility he originally mentioned is not the only one, and the network will render all government intelligence services obsolete. Curt attempts to reason with Owen, asking him to remember the good they've done as spies, and it is revealed that Curt and Owen were lovers. Owen, however, insists that those times are over. Finally, despite the knowledge that harming Owen won't take the system offline, when told to move on, Curt shoots Owen in the head, killing him.

Curt returns to A.S.S. Headquarters and resigns. By destroying the computer system, Tatiana has also destroyed her history of involvement with the KGB, and Curt gives her passports made by Mrs. Mega that will allow her and her family to go back to Russia. Curt tells Tatiana he plans to go off the grid, but, in a phone conversation with his mother, he reveals his new plan to take Chimera down. To the audience, Curt expresses hope about the future, and how man's trust, love, and willpower makes them stronger than any machine ("Spy Again (Reprise)").

After the cast take their bows, they dance along to one last number ("Spy Dance").

Cast and characters

All actors except Curt Mega also play other, more minor parts throughout the show.

Musical numbers

Act I
 "Spies Are Forever" – Mystery Woman, Company
 "The Coldest Goodbye" – Mystery Woman
 "Spy Again" – Mega
 "Somebody's Gotta Do It" – Sergio, The Deadliest Man Alive, Mega, Tatiana 
 "Eyes on the Prize I" – Cynthia, Susan
 "Pay Attention!" – Barb, Company
 "Barb's Lament" – Barb
 "Eyes on the Prize II" – Company
 "Not So Bad" – Baron, Company
 "Torture Tango" – The Deadliest Man Alive, Mega, Tatiana

Act II
 "We Love the Prince!" – Vanger, Company
 "Prisoner of My Past" – Tatiana
 "Doing This" – Mega, Tatiana, Mrs. Mega
 "Pay Attention! (Reprise)"† – Mrs. Mega
 "One More Shot" – Mega, Tatiana, Barb, The Informant 
 "Not So Bad (Reprise)" – Baron, Company
 "One Step Ahead" – Mega, Owen, Company
 "Spies Are Forever (Evil Reprise)"† - Owen
 "Spy Again (Reprise)" – Mega, Company
 "Spy Dance" – Company

† This song is not on the cast album.

Creative team
Director: Corey Lubowich
Choreographer: Lauren Lopez
Scenic Design: Emmy Weldon
Costume Design: Allison Dillard
Lighting Design: Julien V. Elstob
Sound Design: Matt Glenn & Mark Caspary
Stage Manager: Rita Santos

Development
Spies Are Forever was funded through a Kickstarter, which raised $58,830 from 1,147 backers.

Response
Spies Are Forever received a mixed-positive reaction from most reviewers.  La Splash called it "an amusing and clever tale which lightly pokes fun at all the spy exploits that came before," but opined that "if you’re looking for character development, this is not the place to find it."  On Stage and Screen was more positive, calling it "a hilarious, smart, and surprisingly insightful musical about friendship, betrayal, and mostly spies."  They praised the show's catchy music, "an impressive feat for a brand new musical," and said that "production value was extremely impressive."

See also
 Lists of musicals

References

External links
 Spies Are Forever official website

2016 musicals
Musical parodies
Original musicals
Plays set in the 1960s